Josh Byerly is a former Public Affairs Officer and Spokesman for NASA based at the Johnson Space Center in Houston, Texas.

Career

Byerly worked in the Office of Communications and Public Affairs as a NASA spokesperson and served as one of the "voices of NASA", providing commentary from inside Mission Control during Space Shuttle and International Space Station missions.  He has served as commentator on several shuttle missions, including the final Space Shuttle servicing mission to the Hubble Space Telescope and several to the International Space Station. He was ascent commentator for STS-133, the final launch of Space Shuttle Discovery on February 24, 2011. Byerly's voice appears in the Smithsonian's National Air and Space Museum as part of the Space Shuttle Discovery exhibit.

Byerly began his career as a television reporter and producer for KBTX, the CBS affiliate in Bryan, Texas. 
He is a frequent public speaker on the topics of communication, media relations and public engagement and serves as a mentor for college students.

Education
Byerly holds a Bachelor of Science in Journalism from Texas A&M University and a Master of Business Administration in Global Management.

References 

NASA people
Texas A&M University alumni
People from Tyler, Texas
Living people
Year of birth missing (living people)